Mexico City Metro Line 7 is one of the twelve metro lines operating in Mexico City, Mexico.

Opened in 1984, it was the seventh line to be built. Its distinctive color is orange.

Chronology 
The first stretch of Line 7 was opened in 1984. It has been expanded three more times, the last being in 1988.

December 20, 1984: from Tacuba to Auditorio
August 22, 1985: from Auditorio to Tacubaya
December 19, 1985: from Tacubaya to Barranca del Muerto
November 29, 1988: from Tacuba to El Rosario

Rolling stock
Line 7 has had different types of rolling stock throughout the years.

Alstom MP-68: 1984–1999
Concarril NM-73: 1984–present
Concarril NM-79: 1984–present
Alstom MP-82: 1985–1994
Concarril NM-83: 1990–present
CAF NM-02:  2009–present

Currently, out of the 390 trains in the Mexico City Metro network, 33 are in service in Line 7.

Station list 

The stations from north to south: 
{| class="wikitable" rules="all"
|-
!rowspan="2" | No.
!rowspan="2" | Station
!rowspan="2" | Date opened
!rowspan="2" | Level
!colspan="2" | Distance (km)
!rowspan="2" | Connection
!rowspan="2" | Location
|-
!style="font-size: 65%;"|Betweenstations
!style="font-size: 65%;"|Total
|-
|style="background: #; color: white;"|01
|El Rosario 
| rowspan="4" |November 29, 1988
|Grade level, overground access
|style="text-align:right;"|-
|style="text-align:right;"|0.0
|
  Line 6
 El Rosario
  Line 6: El Rosario station
 Routes: 19, 19-A, 59, 59-A, 107
  Lines 4: El Rosario stop  Lines 6: El Rosario stop

|rowspan="4"|Azcapotzalco
|-
|style="background: #; color: white;"|02
|Aquiles Serdán 
| rowspan="3" |Underground,deep tunnel
|style="text-align:right;"|1.8
|style="text-align:right;"|1.8
|
 Routes: 59, 59-A, 107
|-
|style="background: #; color: white;"|03
|Camarones 
|style="text-align:right;"|1.5
|style="text-align:right;"|3.3
|
 Routes: 12, 59, 59-A, 107
 Routes: 10-B, 10-E
|-
|style="background: #; color: white;"|04
|Refinería 
|style="text-align:right;"|1.1
|style="text-align:right;"|4.4
|
 Refinería
 Routes: 59, 107, 107-B
 Routes: 16-D
|-
|style="background: #; color: white;"|05
|Tacuba 
| rowspan="4" |December 20, 1984
|Underground,multi-story trench.
|style="text-align:right;"|1.4
|style="text-align:right;"|5.8
|
  Line 2
 Tacuba
 Routes: 18, 59, 107
 Routes: 11-A, 16-B, 16-D, 19-H
|rowspan="6"|Miguel Hidalgo
|-
|style="background: #; color: white;"|06
|San Joaquín 
| rowspan="9" |Underground,deep tunnel
|style="text-align:right;"|1.6
|style="text-align:right;"|7.4
|
 (at distance)
|-
|style="background: #; color: white;"|07
|Polanco 
|style="text-align:right;"|1.3
|style="text-align:right;"|8.7
|

 Route: 13-D
|-
|style="background: #; color: white;"|08
|Auditorio 
|style="text-align:right;"|1.0
|style="text-align:right;"|9.7
|

  Line 7: Auditorio station
 Routes: 76, 76-A, 300-A
 Routes: 8-B, 8-C, 8-D, 18-D
|-
|style="background: #; color: white;"|09
|Constituyentes 
| rowspan="2" |August 22, 1985
|style="text-align:right;"|1.6
|style="text-align:right;"|11.3
|

  Line 3: Los Pinos station (under construction) 
 Routes: 34-A
 Route: 8-C
|-
|style="background: #; color: white;"|10
|Tacubaya 
|style="text-align:right;"|1.2
|style="text-align:right;"|12.5
|
  Line 1
  Line 9
 Tacubaya
 (at distance)
  Line 2: Tacubaya station
 Routes: 110, 110-B, 110-C, 112, 113-B, 115, 118, 119, 200
 Routes: 1-B, 9-C, 9-E, 21-A
|-
|style="background: #; color: white;"|11
|San Pedro de los Pinos 
| rowspan="4" |December 19, 1985
|style="text-align:right;"|1.2
|style="text-align:right;"|13.7
|

<li> Routes: 13-A, 112, 115-A, 119, 200
<li> Route: 21-A
|rowspan=3| Benito Juárez
|-
|style="background: #; color: white;"|12
|San Antonio 
|style="text-align:right;"|0.8
|style="text-align:right;"|14.5
|
<li>
<li> Routes: 13-A, 112, 115-A, 119, 200
<li> Route: 21-A
|-
|style="background: #; color: white;"|13
|Mixcoac 
|style="text-align:right;"|0.9
|style="text-align:right;"|15.4
|
<li>  Line 12 (out of service)
<li> Mixcoac
<li>
<li> Routes: 1-D, 13-A, 115-A, 116, 119-B, 124, 124-A, 200 (also temporary Line 12 service)
  Line 3: Mixcoac Norte stop, Mixcoac Sur stop
 Route: 21-A
|-
|style="background: #; color: white;"|14
|Barranca del Muerto }}
|style="text-align:right;"|1.6
|style="text-align:right;"|17.0
|
 Barranca del Muerto
[[File:Movilidad Integrada (logo) Red de Transporte de Pasajeros.svg|16px|alt=RTP|RTP]] Routes: 13-A, 115-A, 116, 121-A, 124, 124-A
<li>[[File:Movilidad Integrada (logo) Red de Autobuses de la CDMX.svg|16px|alt=Public buses|Public buses]] Routes: 6-A, 21-A, 21-D
|[[Álvaro Obregón, Mexico City|Álvaro Obregón]]
|}

Ridership
The following table shows each of Line 7 stations total and average daily ridership during 2019.<ref name=afluencia/> 

{| class="wikitable" style="font-size:100%;"
|-
| style="background-color:#FFE6BD" | †
| [[Interchange station|Transfer station]]
|-
| style="background-color:#DDFFDD" | ‡
| [[Train station#Terminus|Terminal]]
|-
| style="background-color:#D0E7FF" | †‡
| Transfer station and terminal
|}

{| class=wikitable style="text-align:center"
|-
! Rank
! Station
! Total ridership
! Average daily
|- style="background-color:#DDFFDD"
| 1 || align=left| [[Barranca del Muerto metro station|Barranca del Muerto]]‡ || 16,681,529 || 45,703
|- style="background-color:#D0E7FF"
| 2 || align=left| [[El Rosario metro station|El Rosario]]†‡ || 12,792,425 || 35,048
|-
| 3 || align=left| [[Polanco metro station|Polanco]] || 13,028,555 || 35,695
|-
| 4 || align=left| [[Auditorio metro station|Auditorio]] || 12,503,639 || 34,257
|-
| 5 || align=left| [[San Joaquín metro station (Mexico City)|San Joaquín]] || 10,755,360 || 29,467
|- style="background-color:#FFE6BD"
| 6 || align=left| [[Mixcoac metro station|Mixcoac]]† || 8,073,781 || 22,120
|-
| 7 || align=left| [[Aquiles Serdán metro station|Aquiles Serdán]] || 5,785,502 || 15,851
|-
| 8 || align=left| [[Camarones metro station|Camarones]] || 5,697,048 || 15,608
|-
| 9 || align=left| [[San Antonio metro station (Mexico City)|San Antonio]] || 5,293,530 || 14,503
|-
| 10 || align=left| [[San Pedro de los Pinos metro station|San Pedro de los Pinos]] || 4,993,274 || 13,680
|-
| 11|| align=left| [[Refinería metro station|Refinería]] || 3,980,593 || 10,906
|- style="background-color:#FFE6BD"
| 12 || align=left| [[Tacuba metro station|Tacuba]]† || 3,173,516 || 8,695
|-
| 13 || align=left| [[Constituyentes metro station|Constituyentes]] || 3,042,974 || 8,337
|- style="background-color:#FFE6BD"
| 14 || align=left| [[Tacubaya metro station|Tacubaya]]† || 2,350,325 || 6,439
|-
! colspan=2| Total !! 108,152,051 !! 296,307
|}

Tourism
Line 7 passes near several places of interest:

[[Polanco, Mexico City|Polanco]], upscale district in Mexico City.
[[Bosque de Chapultepec]], city park.
[[Chapultepec Zoo]]
[[Auditorio Nacional (Mexico)|Auditorio Nacional]], entertainment venue.
[[Paseo de la Reforma]], emblematic avenue of [[Mexico City]].
[[Mixcoac]], neighborhood designated [[Barrios Mágicos of Mexico City|''barrio mágico'' (magical neighborhood)]].

See also 
 [[List of Mexico City Metro lines]]

Notes
{{notelist}}

References 
{{Reflist}}

{{MxMetro}}
{{Mexico City transport network}}

[[Category:Mexico City Metro lines|7]]
[[Category:Railway lines opened in 1984]]
[[Category:1984 establishments in Mexico]]